Ecaterina Oancia (born 25 March 1954 in Sângeorgiu de Pădure) is a Romanian rowing cox

References 
 
 

1954 births
Living people
Romanian female rowers
Rowers at the 1984 Summer Olympics
Rowers at the 1988 Summer Olympics
Olympic gold medalists for Romania
Olympic silver medalists for Romania
Olympic bronze medalists for Romania
Olympic rowers of Romania
Coxswains (rowing)
Olympic medalists in rowing
World Rowing Championships medalists for Romania
Medalists at the 1988 Summer Olympics
Medalists at the 1984 Summer Olympics